Gullah Gullah Island is an American musical children's television series that was produced by and aired on the Nick Jr. programming block on the Nickelodeon network from October 24, 1994, to April 7, 1998. The show was hosted by Ron Daise - now the former vice president for Creative Education at Brookgreen Gardens in Murrells Inlet, South Carolina - and his wife Natalie Daise, both of whom also served as cultural advisors, and were inspired by the Gullah culture of Ron Daise's home of St. Helena Island, South Carolina, part of the Sea Islands.

Cast
 Ron Daise as Ron Alston
 Natalie Daise as Natalie Alston
 James Edward Coleman II as James Alston
 Vanessa Baden as Vanessa Alston
 Hillary Hawkins (singing voice of Vanessa)
 Corey Murphy as Rick
 Manolo Villaverde as Abuelo
 Iris Chacón as Juana
 Pixee Wales as Grandma Pixee
 Amy Brandis as Susana
 Mike Walker as Ranger Mike
 Anita Endsley as Miss Audra (1995-1997)
 Corey Hayes as Corey
 Siti Opeal as Miss Siti
 Simeon Othello Daise as Simeon Alston
 Shaina M. Freeman as Shaina Alston (1994–1997)
 Tristin Mays as Shaina Alston (1997–1998)
 Cristian Sola as Miguel (1997)
 Sara Makeba Daise as Sara (1994–1997)
 Mia Barrington as Mia
 Lisa Campbell as Susie
 Gregory Davis, II as Greg
 Armando Guerra as Armando (1994–1997)
 Philip D. Garcia (1994–1996) as Binyah Binyah
 Justin Campbell (1996–1998) as Binyah Binyah
 Ana Christina Randolph as Marisol
 Bryan Nguyen as Bryan
 Zachary Chartier as Zachary
 Jessica Gorski as Jessica
 Kelly Holden as Greta
 Willa Nathan as Willa
 Jaymen-Angel Clark as Peter
 Jim Kroupa as Chansome the Pelican

Episodes

Season 1 (1994)

Season 2 (1995–96)

Season 3 (1996)

Season 4 (1997–98)

Production

Origin and development
Ron Daise's book Reminiscences of Sea Island Heritage was published in 1987. He and his New York-born wife, Natalie Daise (née Eldridge), followed by creating and touring with a multimedia show, Sea Island Montage, based on the book as well as stories from oral histories of elderly St. Helena Island residents. After one of their performances, the Daises met with an executive producer from Nickelodeon. Creator Maria Perez-Brown had planned on building a multicultural program featuring a "magical island" and was inspired by the Daises to use the Sea Islands and elements of Gullah culture. Part of Nickelodeon's initiative to broaden its preschool programming, Gullah Gullah Island was the first show of its kind to star an African-American family set in an indigenously black community. The show's originality caused some upfront concerns. "We were apprehensive about naming it 'Gullah Gullah Island'. We wanted to make sure the portrayal was positive and didn't in any way poke fun at the culture or the community," Ron Daise said of creating a show based on an existing culture.

Format
Gullah Gullah Island is a sing-along half-hour live-action show.  The format was part of a flexible thinking initiative that taught children to make good choices rather than using rote memorization.

Ron and Natalie Daise play the Alstons, who live on the fictional "Gullah Gullah Island". Additional cast featured the Daise's actual children Simeon and Sara among others, including a full-body puppet frog, Binyah Binyah. The show was taped and recorded at Nickelodeon Studios in Orlando at Universal Studios Florida, with the show Clarissa Explains It All shot on the same set interior and exterior. Modifications were made, like adding different shades of red to the home as shown on Gullah Gullah. Outdoor shots featured Beaufort and Fripp Island, South Carolina. Charleston, South Carolina, was featured in one episode when the family took a trip to the City Market.

Episodes are presented with a unified plot and not separate segments, featuring singing, dancing, learning and encouraging children to think about things like taking care of yourself, animals, telling the truth, social skills, and problem solving. The show also highlights the culture and language of Gullah, descendants of former slaves who live on the Sea Islands off the coast of South Carolina and Georgia.

Broadcast, syndication and marketing
The show ran for four seasons from 1994 to 1998, with a total of 70 episodes. Following the series' end, reruns aired on Nickelodeon through July 2000. Reruns also aired on the Noggin channel during its preschool block; when the Noggin brand was revived as a streaming app in 2015, the entire series of Gullah Gullah Island was made available until its removal in early 2020.

Several special home video releases accompanied the original broadcast, including Gullah Gullah Island: Binyah's Surprise (1994), Gullah Gullah Island: Play Along With Binyah and Friends (1994), Gullah Gullah Island: Dance Along with the Daise Family (1997), and Gullah Gullah Island: Christmas (1998).

Home videos of the show were released on VHS format by Sony Wonder from 1995 to 1996 and later by Paramount from 1997 to 1998. As of February 7, 2012, every season of the series is being released to DVD through Amazon.com's MOD (Manufacture On Demand) program. Nickelodeon licensed a series of children's books, musical cassettes and "Binyah Binyah Polliwog" plush animals.

In January 2021, the entire series was added to Paramount+ (at the time CBS All Access). The Paramount+ broadcast includes a lost episode from a potential Season 5 titled "Shake, Rattle and Roll" which was supposed to originally release back in December 1999.

Home media
Nickelodeon and Amazon.com teamed up to release Gullah Gullah Island and other Nick Jr. shows on manufacture on demand (MOD) on DVD-R discs available exclusively through Amazon.com's CreateSpace arm.

Reception

Critical response
Critical reception of the show was consistently positive, both as a children's show and as groundbreaker for African American programming, it was praised for "vividly colored sets, infectious sing-alongs, unique character accents and quirky humor that defined the show and introduced millions of children to an overlooked but centuries-old branch of African American culture." It was described as "a combination summer camp, cheerleading session and music video." The issues, especially with the first season, had to do with show's depiction being unrealistic. "The songs were lively and catchy, the kids were cute and the general theme was unlike other kids' programming," Jenifer Managan of the Chicago Tribune wrote. However:

... it stars "perfect" parents, Ron and Natalie Daise, who with their three children (who never fight), neighbors and friends seek to entertain and socially educate kids through a sing-song series. While the show encourages active participation from at-home viewers, the dictionary responses and incomparable energy from the Daises make normal parents look like misfits. Perhaps as the show seasons, the lip-syncing will improve and the characters won't be so picture-perfect.

In 1996, TV Guide named the show one of "10 best children's shows". During its original broadcast run it was Nickelodeon's highest-rated preschool show, averaging more 750,000 viewers per episode.

Awards

Binyah Binyah!
In 1997, five episodes of a "Gullah Gullah Island" miniseries titled "Binyah Binyah!" were produced at the now-defunct Nickelodeon Studios in Orlando, Florida, and aired from February 2 to February 6, 1998. A separate theme song written by Sean Altman was given to these episodes. The miniseries also featured several new puppet characters in addition to the original cast and focused on frog Binyah Binyah journeying to locations outside of Gullah Gullah. Ron and Natalie Daise were part of the cast as well. It was never broadcast again after its initial airing of episodes, nor was it released to home video.

See also

 Barney & Friends
 Sesame Street
 Kidsongs

References

External links

 

1990s American black television series
1990s American children's television series
1990s Nickelodeon original programming
1990s preschool education television series
1994 American television series debuts
1998 American television series endings
American children's musical television series
American preschool education television series
American television shows featuring puppetry
English-language television shows
Gullah in popular culture
Nickelodeon original programming
Nick Jr. original programming
Television series about children
Television series about frogs
Television series set on fictional islands
Television shows set in South Carolina
Television shows filmed in Florida
Personal development television series
Fictional islands
Fictional frogs